Steven Bezzina (born 5 January 1987 in Pietà, Malta) is a footballer who plays for Maltese Premier League side Balzan, where he plays as a defender.

Playing career

Valletta
Bezzina joined the Valletta youth set up in 1998. He had been spotted playing for local side Sirens, whom he had joined as a five-year-old in 1992.

He made his debut for Valletta during the 2005–06 season, and quickly established himself as a regular first team player in the squad, he made 16 appearances, but failed to score as Valletta finished in fifth position in the Maltese Premier League.

For the 2006–07 season, Bezzina looked to help Valletta improve on their previous league position, as he made 23 appearances, but again failed to score, Valletta did however manage to improve their league finish, as they recorded a fourth-place finish.

The 2007–08 season proved to be Steve's most successful at Valletta, as the club won the Maltese Premier League title, with Bezzina again making 23 appearances, but failing to score.

Bezzina went into the 2008–09 season, hoping to help the improving Valletta retain the Maltese Premier League title, however the club could only manage a second-place finish, as Hibernians beat them to the title by two points. Bezzina made 23 appearances and scored no goals during the season.

Valletta again finished in second place in the 2009–10 season, Bezzina remained a regular in the first team. He played 27 games and scored his first Maltese Premier League goal in April 2010 against Qormi.

International career

Malta
Bezzina made his international debut for the Maltese national team, and gained his first cap in a friendly on 18 November 2009, in the 4–1 home defeat to Bulgaria.

Honours

Valletta
Winner
 2007–08 Maltese Premier League

Balzan
Winner
 2018-19 Maltese FA Cup

Career statistics
Statistics accurate as of match played 9 August 2009.

References

External links
 

1987 births
Living people
Maltese footballers
Malta international footballers
Balzan F.C. players
Sirens F.C. players
Valletta F.C. players
Sliema Wanderers F.C. players
Msida Saint-Joseph F.C. players
Mosta F.C. players
People from Pietà, Malta
Competitors at the 2005 Mediterranean Games
Association football defenders
Maltese Premier League players
Mediterranean Games competitors for Malta